Schmaltz or Schmalz is a German surname. Notable people with the surname include:

 Clarence Vincent Schmalz (1916–1981), Canadian ice hockey administrator
 Gabriele Krone-Schmalz (born 1949), German journalist and author 
 Herbert Gustave Schmalz (1856–1935), British painter
 Jeffrey Schmalz (1953–1993), American journalist 
 Jordan Schmaltz (born 1993), American ice hockey player
 Julien-Désiré Schmaltz (1771–1826), French colonial administrator
 Nick Schmaltz (born 1996), American ice hockey player
 Roland Schmaltz (born 1974), German chess player
 Tad Schmaltz (born 1960), American philosopher
 Valentin Schmaltz (1572–1622), German writer and theologian
 Wilhelm Schmalz (1901–1983), German army general 

German-language surnames